WSTJ (1340 AM, "The Trail 104.1") is a radio station broadcasting an adult album alternative format. Licensed to St. Johnsbury, Vermont, United States, the station is currently owned by Vermont Broadcast Associates, Inc. WSTJ is an affiliate of the Boston Red Sox Radio Network.

History

Twin State Broadcasters, Inc., obtained a construction permit for a new 250-watt radio station to serve St. Johnsbury on 1340 kHz on May 25, 1949. WTWN had its formal opening on July 10, 1949; the original studios were built atop what had been a manure pit on a farm. Two years later, it lived up to its Twin States moniker when it established a satellite studio in Littleton, New Hampshire. Three years after the station began broadcasting, Don Mullally joined and eventually took over the morning shift: he would remain at the station for most of the next 64 years (with the exception of a short stint in Glens Falls, New York and a brief retirement to serve as the director of the Caledonia County fair), leaving the air for good only two weeks before his death in 2016; he was the last station employee still playing music off of vinyl records. In 1960, WTWN was approved to upgrade from 250 to 1,000 watts.

E. Dean Finney, who had been a manager and owner of the station since the outset, sold WTWN in 1979 to Northeast Kingdom Broadcasting, Inc.; the sale was part of a two-station transaction that also included Finney's only other broadcast holding, WIKE in Newport, as Finney said it was "time for a change" in his life. The new ownership was jointly held by Brent Lambert and Eric H. Johnson, two Boston optometrists who owned stations in California and Wyoming. The new owners changed the call letters to WSTJ on October 1. After Johnson bought out Lambert's stake in the company—which had been transferred to a bank—in 1993, Vermont Broadcast Associates bought WSTJ and the FM station it had started in 1985—WNKV (105.5 FM)—in 1998 for $630,000.

In December 2020, WSTJ launched an FM translator, W281CC (104.1 FM); while the station was still featuring an oldies/adult standards format at the time, it announced its intention to review the format after the Christmas holiday. The new format launched in February 2021 as adult album alternative "The Trail", so named for the region's ski and bike trails.

References

External links

STJ
Adult album alternative radio stations in the United States
Radio stations established in 1949
1949 establishments in Vermont